Tham is a surname. Notable people with the surname include:

Carl Tham (born 1939), Swedish politician
Hilary Tham (1946–2005), Malaysian-born American poet
Jason Tham, Indian dancer, choreographer and actor
Jennifer Tham (born 1962), Singaporean choir conductor and music pedagogue
Lottie Tham (born 1949), Swedish heiress and businesswoman
Michael Rudy Tham (1923?–1998), American boxer and trade unionist
Peter Tham (born 1948), Singaporean stockbroker
Vollrath Tham (1913–1995), Swedish Army officer

See also
 Tham script (Tai Tham / Lanna)
Thams, another surname
Carboprost